Nissoria (Sicilian: Nissurìa) is a comune in the Province of Enna, Sicily, southern Italy.

References

Municipalities of the Province of Enna